The following are people who were born, raised, or who gained significant prominence for living in U.S. state of New Hampshire:

Aeronautics and aviation

 Jay C. Buckey (born 1956), astronaut
 Michael Durant (born 1961), pilot – native
 Thaddeus Lowe (1832–1913), 19th-century balloonist – native
 Christa McAuliffe (1948–1986), astronaut
 Lee Morin (born 1952), astronaut – native
 Richard A. Searfoss (1956–2018), astronaut
 Alan Shepard (1923–1998), astronaut; first American in space – native

Arts and literature

 Eric Aho (born 1966), painter 
 Thomas Bailey Aldrich (1836–1907), poet, novelist, travel writer
 Minnie Willis Baines (1845-unknown), author - native
 Russell Banks (born 1940), novelist
 Lucy Barnes (1780-1809), writer- native
 Amy Beach (1867–1944), composer – native
 Brian Sidney Bembridge (born 1973), artist, designer – native
 Adelaide George Bennett (1848-1911), teacher, poet - native
 Henry Ames Blood (1836–1900), poet, playwright – native
 Philip Booth (1925–2007), poet
 Helen L. Bostwick (1826-1907), author, poet - native
 Ben Bradlee Jr. (born 1948), journalist, author – native
 Dan Brown (born 1964), novelist – native
 Emma Elizabeth Brown (1847-unknown), writer, artist - native
 Bill Bryson (born 1951), author – resident, 1995–2003
 Lisa Carver (born 1968), writer
 Luella J. B. Case (1807-1858), author, hymnist - native
 Willa Cather (1873–1947), novelist
 Charles Carleton Coffin (1823–1896), American Civil War correspondent
 Matt Chandler (writer) (born 1972), children's book author
 David Cote (born 1969), playwright, opera librettist, theater critic – native
 E. E. Cummings (1894–1962), poet
 Decap (born 1984), artist and record producer
 Joseph Dennie (1768–1812), 18th-century writer
 Tomie dePaola (1934–2020), children's book author
 Richard Eberhart (1904–2005), poet
 Clayton Emery (born 1953), author
 Lydia Mary Fay (1804-1878), missionary, writer, translator - native
 James T. Fields (1817–1881), publisher, editor, poet
 Lisa Anne Fletcher (1844-1905), poet, correspondent
 Barbara Newhall Follett (1914–disappeared 1939), writer – native
 Ron Fortier (born 1946), comic book writer
 Daniel Chester French (1850–1931), sculptor – native
 Robert Frost (1874–1963), poet
 Horace Greeley (1811–1872), journalist – native
 Wayne Green (1922–2013), publisher – native
 Donald Hall (1928–2018), poet
 Mary R. Platt Hatch (1848-1905), poet, novelist, short story writer - native
 Grace Webster Hinsdale (1832-1902), author - native
 Nicholas Hondrogen (1952–2007), painter, photographer, sculptor
 Dan Hurlin (born 1955), poet, literary critic – native
 John Irving (born 1942), novelist – native
 Carrie Jones, novelist
 Elizabeth Orton Jones (1910–2005), illustrator
 Jane Kenyon (1947–1995), poet
 Heather King (born 1952), blogger
 Maxine Kumin (1925–2014), poet
 Dudley Leavitt (1772–1851), publisher
 Minnie Mary Lee (1826-1903), author - native
 Alan Lelchuk (born 1938), novelist, editor
 Martha Perry Lowe (1829-1902), poet, activist - native
 Edward MacDowell (1860–1908), pianist, composer
 Mary Stuart James MacMurphy (1846-1934), teacher, author - native
 Joyce Maynard (born 1953), novelist
 Jim McDermott (born 1960), illustrator
 Larkin Goldsmith Mead (1835–1910), sculptor – native
 Grace Metalious (1924–1964), novelist
 Bob Montana (1920–1975), illustrator of Archie comics
 Jules Olitski (1922–2007), painter
 P.J. O'Rourke (1947-2022), political satirist and journalist.
 Maxfield Parrish (1870–1966), painter
 John Perkins (born 1945), author – native
 Mary Elizabeth Perley (1863-unknown), educator, author - native
 Jodi Picoult (born 1966), author
 Fanny Runnells Poole (1863-1940), writer, book reviewer - native
 Eleanor H. Porter (1868–1920), novelist
 Edna Dean Proctor (1829-1823), poet - native
 Melinda Rankin (1811-1888), missionary, writer - native
 Augustus Saint-Gaudens (1848–1907), sculptor
 J. D. Salinger (1919–2010), novelist – lived in Cornish for several decades
 Charles Simic (born 1938), poet
 Katherine Call Simonds (1865-1955), musician, singer, composer, author - native
 Martha Pearson Smith (1836-1912), poet, musician, activist - native
 Armstrong Sperry (1897–1976), children's book author – resident 1941–1976
 Betsey Ann Stearns (1830-1914), inventor, school founder, writer - native
 Mark Steyn (born 1959), political commentator
 Celia Thaxter (1835–1894), poet
 Lydia H. Tilton (1839-1915), educator, activist, journalist, poet - native
 Clara Augusta Jones Trask (1839-1905), writer - native
 Adelaide Cilley Waldron (1843-1909), writer, editor - native
 Adam Warren (born 1967), comic book writer/artist
 Brady Watt, producer, bass player, and bandleader
 Harriet E. Wilson (1825–1900), 19th-century novelist
 Caroline Marshall Woodward (1828-1890), author - native
 Mary Parker Woodworth (1849-1919), writer	- native
 Augusta Harvey Worthen (1823-1910), educator, author - native

Athletes and sports figures

 Victoria Arlen (born 1994), Paralympian swimmer, ESPN personality (Exeter)
 Aaron Baddeley (born 1981), professional golfer (Lebanon)
 Kerry Bascom (born 1969), women's basketball player (Epping)
 Jane Blalock (born 1945), professional golfer (Portsmouth)
 Ernest Blood (1872–1955), men's basketball coach (Manchester)
 Matt Bonner (born 1980), National Basketball Association player – San Antonio Spurs (Concord)
 John Bosa (born 1964), NFL football player Miami Dolphins (Keene)
 Dunbar Bostwick (1908–2006), Olympic ice hockey player – (Concord)
 Kent Carlson (born 1962), NHL ice hockey player – (Concord)
 Chris Carpenter (born 1975), Major League Baseball player – Toronto Blue Jays-St. Louis Cardinals (Raymond)
 Ben Cherington (born 1974), professional baseball executive, general manager of the Boston Red Sox
 Bruce Cunliffe (1925–1989), Olympic ice hockey player – (Keene)
 Charlie Davies (born 1986), Major League Soccer player – D.C. United (Manchester)
 Dangerous Danny Davis (born 1956), professional wrestling referee and wrestler
 Matt Duffy (born 1991), Major League Baseball player – Tampa Bay Rays (Salem)
 Tricia Dunn-Luoma (born 1974), Olympic ice hockey player – (Derry)
 Chad Eaton (born 1972), National Football League defensive tackle (Exeter)
 Eva Fabian (born 1993), American-Israeli world champion swimmer (Keene)
 Mark Fayne (born 1987), NHL ice hockey player – New Jersey Devils (Nashua)
 Carlton Fisk (born 1947), Major League Baseball catcher – Boston Red Sox – (grew up in Charlestown)
 Mike Flanagan (1951–2011), Major League Baseball pitcher – Baltimore Orioles (Manchester)
 Brian Foster (born 1987), professional ice hockey player – (Pembroke)
 Sam Fuld (born 1981), Major League Baseball player and Philadelphia Phillies general manager – Oakland A's (Durham)
 Rich Gale (born 1954), Major League Baseball pitcher – Kansas City Royals (Littleton)
 Jeff Giuliano (born 1979), professional ice hockey player – Iserlohn Roosters (Nashua)
 Jesse Guilford (1895–1962), amateur golfer (Manchester)
 Kirk Hanefeld (born 1956), professional golfer (Claremont)
 Jay Heaps (born 1976), former professional soccer player and current soccer manager – New England Revolution (Nashua)
 James H. Horne (1874–1959), athletic director and coach at Indiana University (Berlin)
 Jed Hoyer (born 1973), executive vice-president and general manager of the Chicago Cubs
 Bill Jackowski (1914–1996), MLB umpire
 Chip Kelly (born 1963), NFL and college football head coach – Philadelphia Eagles, San Francisco 49ers (Dover)
 Katie King-Crowley (born 1975), Olympic ice hockey player – (Salem)
 Scotty Lago (born 1987), snowboarder (Seabrook)
 Greg Landry (born 1946), NFL quarterback (Nashua)
 Paul LaPolice (born 1970), Canadian Football League coach (Nashua)
 Jeff Locke (born 1987), Major League Baseball player – Pittsburgh Pirates (Redstone)
 Hunter Long (born 1998), NFL tight end (Exeter)
 Ben Lovejoy (born 1984), NHL ice hockey player (Concord)
 Hubie McDonough (born 1963), NHL ice hockey player (Manchester)
 Jack McGowan (1930–2001), professional golfer (Concord)
 Justin McIsaac (born 1978), professional wrestler 
 Freddy Meyer (born 1981), ice hockey player – Modo Hockey (Sanbornville)
 Bode Miller (born 1977), alpine ski racer (Easton)
 Bill Moisan (1925–2010), Major League Baseball pitcher – Chicago Cubs (Newton)
 John Morton (born 1946), Olympic biathlon skier (Walpole)
 Tara Mounsey (born 1978), gold medalist at 1998 Winter Olympics (Concord)
 Josh Owens (born 1988), basketball player for Hapoel Tel Aviv of the Israeli Basketball Premier League
 Chad Paronto (born 1975), baseball player (Woodsville)
 Penny Pitou (born 1938), Olympic alpine skier silver medalist (Gilford and Laconia)
 Deron Quint (born 1976), NHL ice hockey player (Durham)
 Kendall Reyes (born 1989), American football defensive end (Nashua)
 Jon Rheault (born 1986), professional ice hockey player (Deering)
 Brandon Rogers (born 1982), professional ice hockey player – (Rochester)
 Red Rolfe (1908–1969), Major League Baseball third baseman, manager and Yale coach (Penacook)
 Kevin Romine (born 1961), utility outfielder in Major League Baseball (Exeter)
 Jeff Serowik (born 1967), NHL ice hockey player (Manchester)
 Leanne Smith (born 1987), alpine skier (Conway)
 Darius Songaila (born 1978), Lithuanian professional basketball player (attended school in New Hampton)
 Matt Taven (born 1985), professional wrestler (Derry)
 Birdie Tebbetts (1912–1999), Major League Baseball player and manager (Nashua) 
 Bob Tewksbury (born 1960), Major League Baseball pitcher (Concord)
 Jenny Thompson (born 1973), swimmer, 12-time Olympic medalist (Dover)
 Paul Thompson (born 1988), NHL ice hockey player (Derry)
 Triple H (born 1969), professional wrestler (Nashua)
 Harold Weber (1882–1933), Olympic golfer (Littleton)
 Bob Whitcher (1917–1997), Major League Baseball pitcher – Boston Braves (Berlin)
 Stan Williams (1936–2021), Major League Baseball pitcher (Enfield)
 Brian Wilson (born 1982), Major League Baseball relief pitcher – San Francisco Giants (Londonderry)

Business persons

 Herbert Archer "H.A." Richardson (1852–1942), timber and shipping magnate
 Betsey Ann Stearns (1830-1914), inventor
Richard and Maurice McDonald (1909 to 1998) and (1902-1971) respectively. They are the founders of original McDonalds restaurant and franchised several of the other early locations. (Manchester)

Criminals

 Lisa Biron (born 1969), child molester
 Carl Drega (1935–1997), killer of state troopers – native
 Brian Dugan (born 1956), rapist and serial killer – native
 Samuel Green (1796–1822), serial killer and robber – native
 H.H. Holmes (1861–1896), serial killer of 1893 – native
 Linda Kasabian (born 1949), member of Manson Family
 Adam Lanza (born 1992), school shooter – born in Exeter
 Daniel Maldonado (born ), Al-Shabaab terrorist – native
 Dennis Moran (1982–2013), computer hacker
 Richard Paul Pavlick (1887–1975), stalked John F. Kennedy – native
 Terry Peder Rasmussen (1943–2010), serial killer 
 Pamela Smart (born 1967), convicted murderer – native
 Forbes Smiley (born 1956), thief of rare maps, found guilty and sentenced to 42 months in prison
 Henry Tufts (1748–1831), 18th century thief – native

Educators

 Samuel Colcord Bartlett (1817–1898), Dartmouth president
 Richard Lederer (born 1938), former St. Paul's School English teacher; author of Anguished English
 Christa McAuliffe (1948–1986), first teacher in space, killed aboard the Space Shuttle Challenger launch

Entertainment

Actors and actresses 

 Bradford Anderson (born 1979), native
 Sam Ayers, native
 Richard Backus (born 1945), native
 Jane Badler (born 1953), native
 Wilson Bethel (born 1984), native
 Peter Bonerz (born 1938)
 James Broderick (1927–1982), native
 Gordon Clapp (born 1948), native
 Patience Cleveland (1931–2004)
 Lew Cody (1884–1934)
 Andy Comeau (born 1970), native
 Zack Conroy (born 1985), native
 Eliza Coupe (born 1981), native
 Matt Czuchry (born 1977), native
 Stephen Dunham (1964–2012)
 Dustin Farnum (1874–1929), native
 Hallie Foote (born 1950)
 Phoebe Foster (1896–1975), native
 Pamela Gidley (1965–2018)
 Michael Graziadei
 Randy Harrison (born 1977), native
 Sam Huntington (born 1982), native
 Jean Kasem (born 1954), native
 William Kendis (1916–1980), native
 Thomas Kopache (born 1945), native
 Walter Long (1879–1952), native
 Dorothy Loudon (1925–2003)
 Kenneth MacKenna (1899–1962), native
 Mandy Moore (born 1984), native
 Jared Nathan (1985–2006), native
 Mike O'Malley (born 1966)
 Sandeep Parikh (born 1980), native
 Maggi Parker (born 1927), native
 Keri Lynn Pratt (born 1978), native
 Perrey Reeves (born 1970), native
 Chris Romano (born 1978), native
 Adam Sandler (born 1966)
 John Shea (born 1949), native
 Laura Silverman (born 1966), native
 Christopher Stone (1942–1995), native
 Ilene Woods (1929–2010), native

Comedians and humorists

 Jay Chanoine (born )
 Ronny Chieng (born 1985)
 Jamie Kaler (born 1964), native
 Josh Meyers (born 1976), brother of Seth Meyers
 Seth Meyers (born 1973), native; brother of Josh Meyers
 Sarah Silverman (born 1970), native

Internet personalities

 Adam22 (born 1983) a.k.a. Adam John Grandmaison – native
 Ludwig Ahgren (born 1995), native

Models

 Mia Tyler (born 1978), native

Musicians

Eddie Mottau Guitarist (born 1943)
 Chris Alfieri, member of Vattnet Viskar
 Gaston Allaire (1916–2011), native
 GG Allin (1956–1993), native
 Dale Bozzio (born 1955), member, Missing Persons
 Mark Brunswick (1902–1971)
 Daniel Cartier (born 1969)
 Charlie Clouser (born 1963), native
 Connie Converse (1924–disappeared 1974), native
 Brad Delp (1951–2007), member, Boston
 Ronnie James Dio (1942–2010), native
 Julie Dubela (born 1991)
 Sully Erna (born 1968), member, Godsmack
 Betty George (1926–2007), native
 Lyman Heath (1804–1870), native
 Gary Hoey (born 1960)
 JoJo (born 1990)
 Ray LaMontagne (born 1973), native
 Tommy Makem (1932–2007)
 Mandy Moore (born 1984), native
 Bill Morrissey (1951–2011)
 Rod Picott (born 1964)
 Patricia Racette (born 1965), opera singer, native
 Tom Rush (born 1941), native
 Joe Seiders (born 1980), member, The New Pornographers
 Will Sheff (born 1976), member, Okkervil River and Shearwater – native
 Cosy Sheridan (born 1964)
 Jon Spencer (born 1965), native
 Bill Staines (1947–2021)
 Buddy Stewart (1922–1950), native
 Sarah Stiles (born 1979)
 Steven Tyler (born 1948), member, Aerosmith
 Brian Viglione (born 1979), member, The Dresden Dolls
 Jillian Wheeler (born 1991)

Television personalities

 Dana Bash (born 1971), CNN journalist
 Tom Bergeron (born 1955), host of ABC's Dancing with the Stars
 Samantha Brown (born 1970), travel journalist
 Ken Burns (born 1953), documentary filmmaker
 Carl Cameron (born 1961), Fox News correspondent
 Corey Lewandowski (born 1973), CNN, Fox News, and One America News Network political commentator; former 2016 Donald Trump presidential campaign manager 
 Don Orsillo (born 1968), baseball broadcaster
 Trish Regan (born 1972), Fox Business anchor
 Kristin Tate, Fox News commentator

Game publishers
 Toby fox (born 1991)

Political and military figures

 Sherman Adams (1899–1986)
 Kelly Ayotte (born 1968), native
 William J. Baroody Jr. (1937–1996), native
 Josiah Bartlett (1729–1795), American Founding Father, physician, statesman, a delegate to the Continental Congress for New Hampshire, and a signatory to the Articles of Confederation and the Declaration of Independence
 Timothy Bedel (1737–1787), native
 Jason Bedrick (born 1983)
 Joseph Blanchard (1704–1758), native
 Edward H. Brooks (1893–1978), native
 Lewis Cass (1782–1866)
 Jonathan Chase (1732–1800)
 Salmon P. Chase (1808–1873), native
 Wentworth Cheswell (1746–1817), native
 Jonathan Cilley (1802–1838), native
 Joseph Cilley (1791–1887) (1791–1887), native
 Joseph Cilley (1734–1799) (1734–1799), native
 Robert W. Cone (1957–2016)
 John Cutt (1613–1681)
 Henry Dearborn (1751–1829), native
 Abraham Drake (1715–1781), native
 Michael Durant (born 1961), native
 Nathaniel Folsom (1726–1790)
 Rene Gagnon (1925–1979), native
 John Taylor Gilman (1753–1828)
 John Goffe (1701–1786)
 David Gottesman (born 1948)
 Judd Gregg (born 1947), native
 Doris Haddock (1910–2010), native
 Enoch Hale (1733–1813)
 Nathan Hale (1743–1780)
 Paul Hodes (born 1951)
 William E. Holyoke (1868–1934), native
 John Langdon (1741–1819), native
 Lyndon LaRouche (1922–2019)
 Corey Lewandowski (born 1973)
 John Lynch (born 1952)
 Sean Patrick Maloney (born 1966)
 Thomas J. McIntyre (1915–1992)
 Frank Merrill (1903–1955), Merrill's Marauders
 Nathaniel Meserve (1704–1758), native
 James Miller (1776–1851), native
 Jonathan Moulton (1726–1787), native
 Moses Nichols (1740–1790)
 Richard O'Kane (1911–1994), native
 Frank Nesmith Parsons (1854–1934), native
 Nathaniel Peabody (1741–1823)
 David Petraeus (born 1952), summer resident
 Benjamin Pierce (1757–1839)
 Franklin Pierce (1804–1869), 14th President of the United States
 Enoch Poor (1736–1780)
 Carol Shea-Porter (born 1952), native
 James Reed (–1807)
 George Reid (1733–1815), native
 Warren Rudman (1930–2012)
 Alexander Scammel (1747–1781)
 Jeanne Shaheen (born 1947)
 Sumner Shapiro (1926–2006)
 Max Silber (1911–2004)
 David Souter (born 1939)
 John Stark (1728–1822), native
 Thomas Stickney (1729–1809), native
 Harlan F. Stone (1872–1946), native
 John Sullivan (1740–1795), native
 John H. Sununu (born 1939)
 John E. Sununu (born 1964)
 Katrina Swett (born 1955)
 Richard Swett (born 1957)
 Meldrim Thomson Jr. (1912–2001)
 Matthew Thornton (1714–1803)
 Colin Van Ostern (born 1979), native
 George H. Wadleigh (1842–1927), native
 John Wentworth (governor) (1737–1820)
 see also John Wentworth (disambiguation)
 Daniel Webster (1782–1852), native
 William Whipple (1731–1785)
 Leonard Wood (1860–1927), native
 Isaac Wyman (1724–1792)
 Louis C. Wyman (1917–2002), native
 Dawn Zimmer (born 1968)

Religious figures

 Mary Baker Eddy (1821–1910)
 John W. Gowdy (1869–1963)
 Monsignor Pierre Hevey (1831–1910)
 Gene Robinson (born 1947)

Scientists and engineers

 Leonard Bailey (1825–1905), inventor, toolmaker, cabinet maker
 C. Loring Brace (1930–2019), anthropologist
 Stuart Chase (1888–1985), economist and engineer
 Jim Collins (born 1965), MacArthur genius, bioengineer and inventor
 William E. Corbin (1869–1951), inventor of paper towels
 Sidney Darlington (1906–1997), electrical engineer and inventor of the Darlington transistor
 Dean Kamen (born 1951), inventor of the Segway and founder of the FIRST Robotics Competition
 Erasmus Darwin Leavitt Jr. (1836–1916), mechanical engineer, known for his steam engine designs
 Edward William Nelson (1855–1934), naturalist and ethnologist
 Sylvester H. Roper (1823–1896), inventor, pioneering builder of early automobiles and motorcycles
 Ambrose Swasey (1846–1937), mechanical engineer, inventor, and entrepreneur
 Earl Silas Tupper (1907–1983), chemist, inventor of Tupperware
 George H. Whipple (1878–1976), physician, pathologist and biomedical researcher; recipient, 1932 Nobel Prize in Physiology or Medicine (Ashland)

Other

 Brooke Astor (1902–2007), philanthropist; recipient, Presidential Medal of Freedom (native)
 Hal Barwood, screenwriter, film producer, game designer and game producer 
 Stephanie Birkitt (born 1975), former assistant to David Letterman on Late Show with David Letterman
 William Robinson Brown (1875–1955), business leader in Coos County; founder and owner, Maynesboro Stud
 H. Maria George Colby (1844-1910), suffragist, activist, journalist - native
 Brian De Palma (born 1940), film director
 Tom Dey (born 1965), film director
 Annie Duke (born 1965), professional poker player; sister of Howard Lederer
 Michael Durant (born 1961), pilot and author
 Dan Eckman (born 1984), director, writer
 Ivan Edwards (physician), ex-minister, community organizer, doctor, Reserve military officer
 Darby Field (1610–1649), first European to climb Mount Washington
 Phineas Gage (1823–1860), railroad construction foreman whose survival of an accident influenced discussion about the brain
 George Hawkins, victim of a bad skin graft that led to the celebrated "Hairy Hand" case of 'Hawkins v. McGee''
 Jenna Miscavige Hill (born 1984), critic of the Church of Scientology
 Gary Hirshberg (born 1954), chief executive officer, Stonyfield Farm 
 Jigger Johnson (1871–1935), lumberjack
 Harriet McEwen Kimball (1834-1917), philanthropist, hospital co-founder, poet, hymnist - native
 A.G. Lafley (born 1947), chief executive officer, Procter & Gamble
 Howard Lederer (born 1964), professional poker player; brother of Annie Duke
 Maurice McDonald (1902–1971), co-founder of McDonald's fast food mega-chain of restaurants
 Richard McDonald (1909–1998), co-founder of McDonald's
 Alanis Obomsawin (born 1932), documentary filmmaker 
 Chris Ohlson (born 1975), film producer and director
 Charles Revson (1906–1975), businessman
 Robert Rodat (born ), screenwriter, producer
 Chris Sheridan (born 1967), TV writer
 Lydia H. Tilton (1839–1915), educator, activist, journalist, poet, lyricist
 Anna Augusta Truitt (1837-1920), philanthropist, reformer, essayist - native
 Jonathan Daniels (1939–1965), Civil rights activist

Gallery

See also

 List of Dartmouth College alumni
 List of Dartmouth College faculty
 List of people from Concord, New Hampshire
 List of people from Dover, New Hampshire
 List of people from Exeter, New Hampshire
 List of people from Hanover, New Hampshire
 List of people from Manchester, New Hampshire
 List of people from Nashua, New Hampshire
 List of people from Portsmouth, New Hampshire
 List of Phillips Exeter Academy alumni
 List of St. Paul's School alumni
 Lists of Americans